The Day Dragged On is the first commercial release and first mini-album by Dragon Ash; released in 1997. The song 天使ノロック (Tenshi no Rokku) became a Buzz Clip (a song deemed popular enough to have its video placed on high rotation) on MTV Japan for one week.

The hidden track Normal consists of a telephone call which plays a demo of the song Ability → Normal from their upcoming release Public Garden, followed by a busy signal indicating that the party on the other line has hung up.

Track listing
"The Day Dragged On" – 2:12
"Siva" – 4:03
"天使ノロック" (Tenshi no Rokku) – 2:49
"Chime" – 4:54
"チェルノブイリに悲しい雨が降る" (Cherunobuiru ni Kanashii Ame ga Furu) – 2:37
"Realism" – 3:33
"羊を数えても夜は終わらない" (Hitsuji o Kazoete mo Yoru wa Owaranai) – 2:38
"Fake X Life" – 3:42
"Normal" (hidden track) – 1:55

References

Dragon Ash albums
1997 EPs
Victor Entertainment EPs